Discherodontus is a genus of small cyprinid fishes found in rivers and streams in Mainland Southeast Asia and Yunnan in China.

Species
There are currently six recognized species in this genus:
 Discherodontus ashmeadi (Fowler, 1937)
 Discherodontus colemani (Fowler, 1937)
 Discherodontus halei (Duncker, 1904)
 Discherodontus parvus (H. W. Wu & R. D. Lin, 1977)
 Discherodontus schroederi (H. M. Smith, 1945)
 Discherodontus somphongsi (Benl & Klausewitz, 1962)

References

Cyprinidae genera
Cyprinid fish of Asia
Taxa named by Walter John Rainboth
Taxonomy articles created by Polbot